Horacio Pancheri (born 2 December 1982) is an Argentine actor and model. He played the lead role Carlos Gomez Ruiz in Un Camino Hacia El Destino, produced by Nathalie Lartilleux, alongside Paulina Goto, Lissete Morelos René Strickler, Ana Patricia Rojo and Jorge Aravena.

Career 
Pancheri was born in Esquel, Argentina. He began his career by posing for magazines in Argentina. In September 2012 Pancheri moved to Mexico to learn acting with René Pereyra and subsequently was admitted to the Centro de Educación Artística of Televisa at the invitation of Eugenio Cobo. After two years of entertainment in March 2014, he made his debut in the Mexican television in the soap opera El color de la pasión, in where he played the young Alonso Gaxiola. In November 2014, producer Mapat L. de Zatarain gave him the opportunity to participate in the telenovela La sombra del pasado, where he plays Renato Ballesteros and shares credit once again with Michelle Renaud, actress that also participated in El color de la pasión. In 2016, he played Carlos Gomez Ruiz a production by Nathalie Lartilleux alongside Paulina Goto, Jorge Aravena and René Strickler.

Filmography

Awards and nominations

References

External links 

1982 births
Argentine male models
Argentine male telenovela actors
21st-century Argentine male actors
Living people